The 2013 World Wushu Championships was the 12th edition of the World Wushu Championships. It was held at the Kuala Lumpur Badminton Stadium in Kuala Lumpur, Malaysia from November 1 to November 5, 2013.

Medal summary

Medal table

Men's taolu

Men's sanda

Women's taolu

Women's sanda

References



World Wushu Championships
Wushu Championships
World Wushu Championships
World Wushu Championships
2013 in wushu (sport)
Wushu in Malaysia